Negros Occidental's 1st congressional district is one of the six congressional districts of the Philippines in the province of Negros Occidental. It has been represented in the House of Representatives of the Philippines since 1916 and earlier in the Philippine Assembly from 1907 to 1916. The district consists of the northern Negros Occidental cities of Escalante and San Carlos, as well as adjacent municipalities of Calatrava, Salvador Benedicto and Toboso. It is currently represented in the 18th Congress by Gerardo Valmayor Jr. of the Nationalist People's Coalition (NPC).

Representation history

Election results

2022

2019

2016

2013

2010

See also
Legislative districts of Negros Occidental

References

Congressional districts of the Philippines
Politics of Negros Occidental
1907 establishments in the Philippines
Congressional districts of Western Visayas
Constituencies established in 1907